Old Tagalog, also known as Old Filipino (Baybayin: pre-virama: ,;), is the earliest form of the Tagalog language during the Classical period. It is the primary language of pre-colonial Tondo, Namayan and Maynila. The language originated from the Proto-Philippine language and evolved to Classical Tagalog, which was the basis for Modern Tagalog. Old Tagalog uses the Tagalog script or Baybayin, one of the scripts indigenous to the Philippines.

Etymology

Very little is known about the ancient history of the language; linguists such as David Zorc and Robert Blust speculate that the Tagalogs and other Central Philippine ethno-linguistic groups had originated in Northeastern Mindanao or the Eastern Visayas.

History

Old Tagalog is one of the Central Philippine languages, which evolved from the Proto-Philippine language, which comes from the Austronesian peoples who settled in the Philippines around 2200 BC.

The early history of the Tagalog language remains relatively obscure, and a number of theories exist as to the exact origins of the Tagalog peoples and their language. Scholars such as Robert Blust suggest that the Tagalogs originated in northeastern Mindanao or the eastern Visayas. Possible words of Old Tagalog origin are attested in the Laguna Copperplate Inscription from the 10th century, which is largely written in Old Malay. The book also used Baybayin script.

The question has been raised about the origin of some words in the various languages of the Philippines and their possible connection to ancient Buddhist and Hindu culture in the region, as the language is influenced by Sanskrit, Malay, Tamil and Chinese.

Writing system

Old Tagalog was written in Baybayin, a writing system formerly used in the Philippines which belongs to the Brahmic family of scripts.

Phonology

See also
 Proto-Philippine language
 Filipino language
 Dambana
 Baybayin
 Filipino alphabet
 Languages of the Philippines
 Suyat
 Laguna Copperplate Inscription (LCI)

References

External links

 A Handbook and Grammar of the Tagalog Language, by W.E.W. MacKinlay, 1905.
 Online E-book of Doctrina Christiana in Old Tagalog and Old Spanish, the first book published in the Philippines. Manila. 1593
 Online E-book of Arte de la Lengua Tagala y Manual Tagalog by Sebastián de Totanes published in Binondo, Manila in 1865
 http://unicode-table.com/en/sections/tagalog/

Tagalog language
Subject–verb–object languages
Verb–object–subject languages
Verb–subject–object languages
Medieval languages
Languages of the Philippines
Languages attested from the 10th century